"Faster Harder Scooter" (Stylized as FasterHarderScooter) is a song by German group Scooter. It was released in August 1999 as the lead single from the 1999 album Back to the Heavyweight Jam. The song is played as an anthem by FC Tokyo as the players walk out on home games.

Track listing
CD Single
 "Faster Harder Scooter" - 3:42
 "Faster Harder Scooter" (Full Length) - 4:24
 "Faster Harder Scooter" (Club Mix) - 5:21
 "Faster Harder Scooter" (Sunbeam Remix) - 9:23
 "Faster Harder Scooter" (Signum Remix) - 7:20

Chart performance

Weekly charts

Year-end charts

Certifications

References

Scooter (band) songs
1999 singles
1998 songs
Songs written by H.P. Baxxter
Songs written by Rick J. Jordan
Songs written by Jens Thele

cs:Call Me Mañana
hu:Call Me Mañana